Starkville Academy (SA) is a private kindergarten through 12th grade school in Starkville, Mississippi, operated by the Oktibbeha Educational Foundation. It was founded in 1969 on property adjacent to Starkville High School as a segregation academy.

History
When the federal government enforced school integration, many white parents sought ways to keep their children from attending integrated schools. Starkville Academy was founded in 1969 to provide white children a segregated education.

In 1970, the Oktibbeha Educational Foundation's tax exempt status was revoked after it declined to provide the IRS with documentation that the school had a racially nondiscriminatory admissions policy.

In 1977, Starkville Academy was among a group of all-white private schools sued by parents of black children enrolled in Humphreys County public schools in the case Bishop v. Starkville Academy. The parents asked for an injunction blocking payments under a Mississippi program that provided tuition grants for intellectually disabled students to attend private schools. A three-judge panel from the United States District Court for the Northern District of Mississippi unanimously ruled that, since the program allowed the grants to be used at schools with racially restrictive admissions policies, such as Starkville Academy, the program violated the Equal Protection Clause of the United States Constitution.

The school property was annexed into Starkville in 1980, but was not charged for certain public services provided by the city. In 1984, the NAACP filed a lawsuit alleging that the city of Starkville had illegally provided free water and electricity to the school. The NAACP claimed that the free utility service was unconstitutional aid to a school that practiced racial discrimination.

In 1993, the NAACP asked Starkville School District to follow the precedent set in Cook v. Hudson and bar public school teachers from sending their own children to Starkville Academy and other racially discriminatory private schools. At the time, the head of Starkville Academy said no blacks had ever applied or enrolled. In 1999 Oktibbeha County school board member Allen McBroom did not seek reelection so he could enroll his son in Starkville Academy.

Contrary to predictions, the school experienced an outflow of students when the predominantly white Starkville School district merged with the predominantly black Oktibbeha County School District to form the Starkville Oktibbeha Consolidated School District in 2015.

Demographics
As of 2012, the student population was 96% white, 2% Asian, 1% Hispanic and 1% black. In the 2015–16 school year, eight of 615 students were black.

Athletics
Starkville Academy competes under the nickname Volunteers within the Mississippi Association of Independent Schools league.

In 2019, the Starkville Academy football team won the MAIS AAA State Championship over Indianola Academy to win the 7th MAIS Championship in the history of the school.

In 2016, the Starkville Academy girls soccer team won their first MAIS soccer championship (Division III) by defeating Hartfield Academy.

Notable alumni
Scott Tracy Griffin, author
Neely Tucker, journalist, author
Casey Woods, NCAA football coach

References

External links
 Starkville Academy

Private K-12 schools in Mississippi
Preparatory schools in Mississippi
Segregation academies in Mississippi
Educational institutions established in 1969
1969 establishments in Mississippi
Schools in Oktibbeha County, Mississippi
Starkville, Mississippi